Gmina Skoczów is an urban-rural gmina (administrative district) in Cieszyn County, Silesian Voivodeship, in southern Poland, in the historical region of Cieszyn Silesia. Its seat is the town of Skoczów.

Villages

Bładnice and Ochaby are further subdivided into Dolne (Lower) and Górne (Upper) parts.

Neighbouring gminas
Gmina Skoczów is bordered by the gminas of Brenna, Chybie, Dębowiec, Goleszów, Jasienica, Strumień and Ustroń.

Twin towns – sister cities

Gmina Skoczów is twinned with:
 Hrádek, Czech Republic

References

External links
 

Skoczow
Cieszyn County
Cieszyn Silesia